"Love Story" is the tenth single by melody. under the Toy's Factory label released May 30, 2007. The single stayed on the Oricon for 2 weeks and peaked at number 21. To date, the single has sold 10,922 copies.

Track listing
 Love Story (4:52)
 BoRn 2 luv U (melody. Loves M-Flo) (3:28)
 Lovin' U: Deckstream Remix (3:58)
 Love Story (instrumental) (4:50)

2007 singles
2007 songs
Melody (Japanese singer) songs
Toy's Factory singles